The following is an alphabetical list of topics related to the Republic of Costa Rica.

0–9

.cr – Internet country code top-level domain for Costa Rica

A
Adjacent countries:

Abangares River
Abel Pacheco
Alajuela Province
Alfredo González Flores
Americas
North America
Central America
Islands of Costa Rica
North Atlantic Ocean
Mar Caribe (Caribbean Sea)
North Pacific Ocean
Aniceto Esquivel Sáenz
António Pinto Soares
Aranjuez River
Arenal River
Ascensión Esquivel Ibarra
Arenal Volcano
Atlas of Costa Rica
Atirro River

B
Banano River
Barranca River
Manuel Antonio Barrantes Rodríguez
Bebedero River
Bernardo Soto Alfaro
Braulio Carrillo Colina
Broad Front (Costa Rica)
Brunca
Bruno Carranza

C
Cantons of Costa Rica
Cañas River (Bebedero River)
Cañas River (Tempisque River)
Capital of Costa Rica:  San José de Costa Rica
Carmen Beach
Cartago Province
Emilia Castro de Barish
Categories:
:Category:Costa Rica
:Category:Buildings and structures in Costa Rica
:Category:Censuses in Costa Rica
:Category:Communications in Costa Rica
:Category:Costa Rica stubs
:Category:Costa Rican culture
:Category:Costa Rican expatriate footballers
:Category:Costa Rican people
:Category:Costa Rica-related lists
:Category:Economy of Costa Rica
:Category:Education in Costa Rica
:Category:Environment of Costa Rica
:Category:Geography of Costa Rica
:Category:Government of Costa Rica
:Category:Health in Costa Rica
:Category:History of Costa Rica
:Category:Images of Costa Rica
:Category:Law of Costa Rica
:Category:Military of Costa Rica
:Category:Politics of Costa Rica
:Category:Science and technology in Costa Rica
:Category:Society of Costa Rica
:Category:Sport in Costa Rica
:Category:Transportation in Costa Rica
:Category:Years in Costa Rica
:Category:Years of the 19th century in Costa Rica
:Category:Years of the 20th century in Costa Rica
:Category:Years of the 21st century in Costa Rica
commons:Category:Costa Rica
Celeste River (Buenavista River)
Central America
Cerro Chirripó
Cerro Kamuk
Chirripó Duchi River (Chirripó Atlañtico River)
Chirripó Pacifico River
Chirripó River
Chorreador
Cleto González Víquez

Coat of arms of Costa Rica
Coen River
Colorado River (Costa Rica)
Colorado River (Tempisque River tributary)
Corobicí River
Costa Rica
Costa Rica 2000 Census
Costa Rica 2011 Census
Costa Rican Civil War
Costa Rican colón
Costa Rica under Mexican rule
Coto Brus River
Coto Colorado River
Cuisine of Costa Rica
Culture of Costa Rica

D
Daniel Oduber Quirós
Dechibeta Hot Springs
Demographics of Costa Rica
Districts of Costa Rica

E
Economy of Costa Rica
Education in Costa Rica
Estrella River

F

Federal Republic of Central America
Federico Tinoco Granados
Finca Bellavista
Flag of Costa Rica
Francisco Aguilar Barquero
Francisco María Oreamuno Bonilla
Francisco Morazán
Francisco Orlich Bolmarcich
Frío River

G
General River
Geography of Costa Rica
Guacimal River
Guanacaste Province

H
Heredia Province
"Himno Nacional de Costa Rica"
History of Costa Rica
Hospital Dr. Tony Facio Castro

I
Instituto Nacional de Biodiversidad
International Organization for Standardization (ISO)
ISO 3166-1 alpha-2 country code for Costa Rica: CR
ISO 3166-1 alpha-3 country code for Costa Rica: CRI
ISO 3166-2:CR region codes for Costa Rica
Irazú Volcano
Islands of Costa Rica
Isla Brava
Isla Calero
Isla Damas
Isla del Caño
Isla del Coco
Isla San Lucas

J
Jacó, Costa Rica
Jesús Jiménez Zamora
Jesús María River
Jiménez River
Joaquín Mora Fernández
José Figueres Ferrer
José Joaquín Rodríguez Zeledón
José Joaquín Trejos Fernández
José María Alfaro Zamora
José María Castro Madriz
José María Figueres
José María Montealegre
José Rafael Gallegos
Juan Bautista Quirós Segura
Juan Mora Fernández
Juan Rafael Mora Porras
Julio Acosta García

K
Keel-billed motmot
Key Largo (bar)
King vulture

L
Lagarto River
Lake Arenal
Languages of Costa Rica
Lari River
Latin America
Laura Chinchilla
Legislative Assembly of Costa Rica
León Cortés Castro
LGBT rights in Costa Rica (Gay rights)
Liberia River
Limón Province
Limónese Creole
Lists related to Costa Rica:
Diplomatic missions of Costa Rica
Islands of Costa Rica
List of birds of Costa Rica
List of companies of Costa Rica
List of Conservation Areas of Costa Rica
List of Costa Rica-related topics
List of diplomatic missions in Costa Rica
List of hospitals in Costa Rica
List of museums in Costa Rica
List of presidents of Costa Rica
List of reptiles in Costa Rica
List of soccer clubs in Costa Rica
List of volcanoes in Costa Rica
Topic outline of Costa Rica
Luis Alberto Monge

M
Manuel Aguilar Chacón
Mar Caribe
Mario Echandi Jiménez
Matina River
Miguel Ángel Rodríguez
Miguel Mora Porras
Military of Costa Rica
Miravalles Volcano
Metal Gear Solid: Peace Walker

N
Naranjo River
National anthem of Costa Rica
Nicoya Peninsula
Niño River (Pizote River)
"Noble patria, tu hermosa bandera"
Nosara River
North America
Northern Hemisphere

O
Organization of American States
Orosí River
Orosí Volcano
Óscar Arias
Otilio Ulate Blanco

P
Rubén Pacheco
Pacuare River
Parismina River
Pejibaye River
Piedras River
Pirris River
Poás Volcano
Pocosol River
Politics of Costa Rica
Próspero Fernández Oreamuno
Provinces of Costa Rica
Puntarenas Province

Q

R
Rafael Ángel Calderón Fournier
Rafael Ángel Calderón Guardia 
Rafael Sáenz Rodríguez 
Rafael Yglesias Castro
Religion in Costa Rica
Reventazón River
Ricardo Jiménez Oreamuno
Rincón de la Vieja Volcano
Rodrigo Carazo Odio

S
Sabogal River
Salto River
San Carlos River
San José, Costa Rica – Capital of Costa Rica
San José Province
San Juan River
Sapoá River
Sarapiquí River
Saturnino Lizano Gutiérrez
Savegre River
Sierpe River
Sintagma — Costa Rican rock band
Sixaola River
Spanish colonization of the Americas
Spanish language
Sucio River
Suerte River

T
Tamarindo River
Tárcoles River
Telire River
Tempisque River
Tenorio River
Tenorio Volcano National Park
Teodoro Picado Michalski
Térraba River
To the Stars: Costa Rica in NASA
Tomás Guardia Gutiérrez
Topic outline of Costa Rica
Toro River
Tortuguero River
Tourism in Costa Rica
Tropics
Turrialba Volcano

U
United Nations founding member state 1945
Uren River
Uvita Island

V
César Valverde Vega
Vicente Herrera Zeledón

W
Water supply and sanitation in Costa Rica
Western Hemisphere

Wikipedia:WikiProject Topic outline/Drafts/Topic outline of Costa Rica
Wildlife of Costa Rica

X

Y
Yorkin River

Z
Zapote River

See also

List of Central America-related topics
List of international rankings
Lists of country-related topics
Topic outline of Costa Rica
Topic outline of geography
Topic outline of North America
United Nations

References

External links

 
Costa Rica